Pierre Montan Berton (7 January 1727 – 14 May 1780) was a French composer and conductor. He resided primarily in Paris and was an opera director.

Pierre's son Henri Montan Berton (1767–1844) was also a composer, more famous than Pierre himself.

Operas

Sources
Article on Berton on the site CESAR (accessed on 31 October 2013)

External links 

 

1727 births
1780 deaths
French male composers
French conductors (music)
French male conductors (music)
18th-century French composers
18th-century French male musicians
18th-century conductors (music)
French ballet composers
Directors of the Paris Opera